Hasan Abdulwahab Al-Qadhi  is a retired United Arab Emirates football player who played for the United Arab Emirates national football team in the 1984 Asian Cup.

References
Stats

20th-century births
Living people
Emirati footballers
United Arab Emirates international footballers
1984 AFC Asian Cup players
UAE Pro League players
Association footballers not categorized by position
Year of birth missing (living people)